The 1906 Montana football team represented the University of Montana in the 1906 college football season. They were led by second-year head coach Frederick Schule, and finished the season with a record of two wins and four losses (2–4).

Schedule

References

Montana
Montana Grizzlies football seasons
Montana football